Scrobicularia is a genus of bivalve mollusc belonging to the family Semelidae. It is sometimes placed in its own family, Scrobicularidae.

Species
There are two recognised species:
Scrobicularia cottardi (Payraudeau, 1826)
Scrobicularia plana (da Costa, 1778)

However, ITIS only recognizes Scrobicularia caduca. There are also names with uncertain status:
Scrobicularia ceylonica E. A. Smith, 1896 – taxon inquirendum
Scrobicularia caduca Gould, 1861 – nomen dubium
Scrobicularia rubiginosa (Poli, 1795) – nomen dubium

References

Semelidae
Bivalve genera